New San Jose Builders, Inc. (NSJBI) is a Philippine real estate company based in Quezon City.

History
New San Jose Builders, Inc. (NSJBI) was incorporated in 1986. Its initial project was to develop land and infrastructure for the National Housing Authority (NHA) in Bagong Silang and nearby areas in Caloocan. NSJBI would later fulfill projects by the government and develop and build its own residential condominiums.

Projects

The New San Jose Builders has strong ties with the Philippine government securing. The NSJBI secured multiple infrastructure and housing deals with the government. The company under Isagani Germar and Felicismo Isidoro was involved in several government projects such as Quezon City Hall of Justice, the Katarungan Village for Department of Justice employees, Government Service Insurance System (GSIS) housing, associated roads and facilities of Subic Bay International Airport, National Housing Authority (NHA) socialized housing and the Mount Pinatubo Lowland Resettlement Housing.

NSJBI is also involved in the renovation of the Boracay Mansion, a large residential building allegedly owned by former President Joseph Estrada.

The company has also built several residential condominiums in Metro Manila. It is also known for being involved in the construction of the Philippine Arena in Bulacan, the largest indoor arena in the world as well as for being the developer and contractor of the Las Casas Filipinas de Acuzar, a resort in Bataan known for its transplanted heritage buildings. The Las Casas' buildings are controversial for being transplanted and reconstructed from their original locations elsewhere.

NSJBI acquired the Manuel L. Quezon University in October 2014.

Sports
The company organized the New San Jose Builders Victorias, a women's volleyball club which played in the 2016 Invitational Cup of the Philippine Super Liga.

References

1986 establishments in the Philippines
Companies established in 1986
Construction and civil engineering companies of the Philippines
Companies based in Quezon City